Rudolf Franz Lehnert (13 July 1878 – 16 January 1948) was an Austrian photographer. He was noted for producing Orientalist images.

Life 
Lehnert was born in Gross Aupa in Bohemia, Austria-Hungary (now Velká Úpa, part of Pec pod Sněžkou in the Czech Republic).

He first travelled to Tunis in 1904, and in 1904 he again visited with his friend, and subsequent business partner, Ernst Heinrich Landrock. The pair established a photographic studio in Tunis and worked closely for more than 20 years. They later established studios in successively, Munich, Leipzig and Cairo, publishing the works as by "Lehnert & Landrock".

From the 1860s onwards, photographs of people with different cultural values and sexual morality became popular for artistic and erotic reasons. According to Pascal Baetens, they border on racism and ethnocentrism.

Lehnert spent the last part of his life at Redeyef, Gafza Oasis, Tunisia, where he died.

See also
 List of Orientalist artists
 Orientalism

References

1878 births
1948 deaths
People from Pec pod Sněžkou
Austrian photographers
Czech photographers
Commercial photographers
Austrian erotic photographers
Czech erotic photographers
Austrian painters
Czech painters
Orientalist painters
Austro-Hungarian photographers
Expatriates from the Austro-Hungarian Empire in Tunisia